Pierre Max Rosenberg  (born 13 April 1936) is a French art historian, curator, and professor. Rosenberg is the honorary president a director of the Musée du Louvre in Paris, and since 1995, he has held the 23rd seat of the Académie Française. He was Slade Professor of Fine Art at the University of Cambridge in 1987.

Early life
Although born to a Jewish family in Paris, Rosenberg grew up in Lot-et-Garonne and Gironde in southwestern France. He attended secondary education at the Lycée Charlemagne in Paris. He continued on to the École du Louvre, where he earned a law degree. In 1961, he was awarded the Henri Focillon Fellowship to study for one year at Yale University.

Career
In 1962, Rosenberg joined the Department of Paintings at the Musée du Louvre as an assistant curator. In 1977, he was invited to study at the Institute for Advanced Study in Princeton, New Jersey. In 1987, he became Slade Professor of Fine Art at the University of Cambridge. After his promotion to curator, he later became director of the museum in October 1994 and served at this post until 13 April 2001.

Rosenberg was elected to the American Academy of Arts and Sciences in 1990 and the American Philosophical Society in 1997. On 7 December 1995, Rosenberg was elected to the Académie Française, replacing Henri Gouhier. He is also an honorary member of the Accademia delle Arti del Disegno of Florence.

Throughout his career, Rosenberg has published monographs on numerous seventeenth-, eighteenth-, and nineteenth-century French artists including Jean-Baptiste-Siméon Chardin, Jacques-Louis David, Jean-Honoré Fragonard, Laurent de La Hyre, Georges de La Tour, the Le Nain brothers, Jean-François Pierre Peyron, Nicolas Poussin, and Jean-Antoine Watteau.

Honors
In 1995, Rosenberg, along with Louis-Antoine Prat, was awarded the Prize XVIIe for their catalogue raisonné on the drawings of David.
In 1996, Rosenberg delivered the annual A. W. Mellon Lectures in the Fine Arts at the National Gallery of Art.
In 1999, Rosenberg was awarded the honor of 2nd Class, Grand Officer of the Order of Merit of the Italian Republic.

Personal life
In 1981, Rosenberg married Béatrice de Rothschild, the daughter of the late Alain de Rothschild. This was Béatrice's second marriage; she married Armand Angliviel de la Beaumelle in 1962, but Armand died only two years later. He was the stepfather of Marie Angliviel de la Beaumelle.

Works

Chardin, 1699–1779, 1979, 
France in the Golden Age: Seventeenth-Century French Paintings in American Collections, 1982, 
Fragonard, 1988, 
Collab. with Renaud Temperini, Poussin : « Je n'ai rien négligé », collection « Découvertes Gallimard » (nº 233), série Arts, 1994, 
Collab. with Hélène Prigent, Chardin : La nature silencieuse, collection « Découvertes Gallimard » (nº 377), série Arts, 1999, 
Chardin: An Intimate Art, 'New Horizons' series, 2000
Chardin: An Intimate Art, "Abrams Discoveries" series, 2000
Chardin, 2000, 
From Drawing to Painting: Poussin, Watteau, Fragonard, David, and Ingres, 2000, 
Only in America: 100 European Masterpieces in American Museums, 2006,

References

External links
 Académie française profile 

1936 births
Living people
20th-century French Jews
Writers from Paris
French male writers
French art historians
French art curators
Yale University fellows
Princeton University fellows
Directors of the Louvre
Academics of the University of Cambridge
Members of the Académie Française
Commandeurs of the Légion d'honneur
Knights of the Ordre national du Mérite
Grand Officers of the Order of Merit of the Italian Republic
Rothschild family
Members of the American Philosophical Society